Fight Songs is the fourth studio album by American alternative country band Old 97's, first released on April 27, 1999. It features the song "Murder (Or a Heart Attack)", which was ranked #176 on Blender magazine's list of "500 Greatest Songs From 1980-2005."

The group's second record on Elektra Records, Fight Songs is more slick and pop-oriented than the group's previous efforts, a trend continued on 2001's Satellite Rides. The song "Crash on the Barrelhead" is rumored to be targeted at alt-country rival, Ryan Adams, while "Murder ..." was inspired by a cat owned by singer Miller's roommate in Los Angeles.

Track listing
All songs written by Rhett Miller, Ken Bethea, Murry Hammond and Philip Peeples.
"Jagged" – 3:27
"Lonely Holiday" – 4:08
"Oppenheimer" – 3:28
"Indefinitely" – 3:41
"What We Talk About" – 4:10
"Crash on the Barrelhead"  (vocals by Murry Hammond) – 2:39
"Murder (Or a Heart Attack)" – 3:41
"Alone So Far" – 4:17
"Busted Afternoon" – 3:11
"19" – 3:41
"Let the Idiot Speak" – 3:43
"Valentine" (vocals by Murry Hammond) – 3:08

Personnel
Old 97's
Ken Bethea – guitar
Murry Hammond – bass, vocals
Rhett Miller – vocals, guitar
Philip Peeples – drums, percussion

Additional personnel
Jon Rauhouse – steel on "Jagged", "Lonely Holiday" and "Alone So Far"
Jon Brion – Vox organ on "Murder (Or a Heart Attack)"
Andrew Williams – odds and ends

References

Old 97's albums
1999 albums
Elektra Records albums